Australian Jews, or Jewish Australians, are Jews who are Australian citizens or permanent residents of Australia. In the 2016 census, there were 21,175 Australians who identified as Jewish by ancestry, a decrease from 25,716 in the 2011 census, and 91,016 Australians who identified as adherents of Judaism, which is a 6% decrease on 97,355 adherents of Judaism in the 2011 census.  The actual number is almost certainly higher, because an answer to the religion question on the census was optional and because Holocaust survivors, Haredi Jews or many non-practising Jews are believed to prefer not to disclose religion in the census. By comparison, the Israeli newspaper Haaretz estimated a Jewish-Australian population of 120,000-150,000 (not limited to adherents of Judaism), while other estimates based on the death rate in the community estimate the size of the community as 250,000. Based on the census data, Jewish citizens make up about 0.4% of the Australian population. The Jewish community of Australia is composed mostly of Ashkenazi Jews, though there are Jews in Australia from many other traditions and levels of religious observance and participation in the Jewish community.

History

The history of the Jews in Australia is contained in comprehensive major general histories by the academic historians Hilary L. Rubinstein, William Rubinstein, and Suzanne Rutland, as well as in specialised works by such scholars as Rabbi John Levi and Yossi Aron covering specific topics and time periods. The twice-a-year (June and November) Journals of the Australian Jewish Historical Society (the June issues edited in Sydney by Professor Rutland and the November issues in Melbourne by Dr Hilary Rubinstein) carry many useful original articles by both professional and amateur historians, and should not be overlooked. The first Jews to come to Australia were at least eight English convicts transported to Botany Bay in 1788 aboard the First Fleet. About 15,100 convicts were transported by the time transportation ceased in 1840 in New South Wales and 1853 in Tasmania. It is estimated that of those who arrived by 1845 about 800 were Jewish. Most of them came from London, were of working-class background and were male. Only 7% of Jewish convicts were female, compared with 15% for non-Jewish convicts. The average age of the Jewish convicts was 25, but ranged from 8 to elderly.

At first, the Church of England was the established religion, and during the early years of transportation all convicts were required to attend Anglican services on Sundays. This included Irish Catholics as well as the Jews. Similarly, education in the new settlement was Anglican church controlled until the 1840s.

The first move toward organisation in the community was the formation of a Chevra Kadisha (a Jewish burial society) in Sydney in 1817, but the allocation of land for a Jewish cemetery was not approved until 1832. In 1830 the first Jewish wedding in Australia was celebrated, the contracting parties being Moses Joseph and Rosetta Nathan.

Jewish immigration in the interwar period came at a time of antisemitism and the White Australia policy. The Returned Services League and other groups publicised cartoons to encourage the government and the immigration Minister Arthur A. Calwell to stem the flow of Jewish immigrants.

Sephardi Jews first immigrated to Australia in the mid-to-late 19th century, and the community thrived for some twenty years, there was a Sephardic congregation, and some Sephardi families occupied important communal positions. Gradually, however, the Sephardi population declined, and the congregation was disbanded in 1873. A new Sephardic community also emerged in the post-war period. Previously, Mizrahi Jews were generally not permitted to enter due to Australia's White Australia policy. However, following the Suez Crisis in 1956, a number of Egyptian Jews were allowed to enter. Over the following years, overtures from Jewish communities led the government to drop its previous stance on entry of Mizrahi Jews. By 1969, when Iraqi Jews were being persecuted, the government granted refugee status to Iraqi Jews who managed to reach Australia.

 
In Australia, in the wake of the outbreak of World War II, Jews escaping the Nazis who had German passports, such as two-year-old Eva Duldig, who years later was a top tennis player for Australia, and her parents sculptor Karl Duldig and artist and inventor Slawa Duldig, were classified as enemy aliens upon their arrival due to their having arrived with German identity papers. Beginning the year prior to their arrival in Australia, a new Australian law had designated people "enemy aliens" if they were Germans, or were Australians who had been born in Germany. The Australian government therefore interned the three of them for two years in isolated Tatura Internment Camp 3 D, 180 kilometers north of Melbourne. They were held with nearly 300 other internees. The internment camp was located near Shepparton, in the northern part of the state of Victoria. There, armed soldiers manned watchtowers and scanned the camp that was bordered by a barbed wire fence with searchlights, and other armed soldiers patrolled the camp. Petitions to Australian politicians, stressing that they were Jewish refugees and therefore being unjustly imprisoned, had no effect. They remained in the internment camp until 1942, when her father enlisted in the Australian Army.

Culture

Jewish streams and movements
There are three main streams of Judaism active in Australia: Orthodox (Modern and ultra-orthodox), Conservative and Reform. Statistics are only available for the Melbourne community, but they are considered representative of other Jewish communities around the country. In Melbourne, 6% of Jews identify themselves as 'strictly orthodox,' 33% as 'traditionally religious' and 15% as 'Liberal or Reform.' 43% consider themselves as 'Jewish but not religious,' whilst 1% as 'opposed to religion' altogether. Many of the Jews who consider themselves 'Jewish but not religious' still send their children to orthodox Jewish day schools or are members of Orthodox synagogues.

According to Suzanne Rutland, 'most Australian Jews can be best described as non-practising orthodox.'  This Anglo-Jewish community developed its own form of 'modern Orthodoxy' which remains predominant until today.

Hitler's ascent to power and the horrors of World War II also brought large numbers of refugees from central Europe. From the mid-1930s, Temple Beth Israel in Melbourne became the basis of a Reform community because of its newly arrived German members. The Temple's German-born rabbi played an integral role in promoting the movement and, in 1938, when visiting Sydney, he established Temple Emanuel. It also attracted many Jews from Germany and other parts of Central Europe, who arrived in Sydney prior to the outbreak of the war.

The 1940s and 1950s saw the emergence of ultra-Orthodox Haredi and Hasidic communities in Sydney and Melbourne. The first Sephardic synagogue in Australia was founded in 1962.

There had been at least two short-lived efforts to establish Reform congregations, the first as early as the 1890s. However, in 1930, under the leadership of Ada Phillips, a Liberal or Progressive congregation, Temple Beth Israel, was permanently established in Melbourne. In 1938 the long-serving senior rabbi, Rabbi Dr Herman Sanger, was instrumental in establishing another synagogue, Temple Emanuel in Sydney. He also played a part in founding a number of other Liberal synagogues in other cities in both Australia and New Zealand. The first Australian-born rabbi, Rabbi Dr John Levi, served the Australian Liberal movement.

In 2012, the first Humanistic Jewish congregation, known as Kehilat Kolenu, was established in Melbourne, with links to the cultural Jewish youth movement Habonim Dror. Later in 2012, a similar congregation was established in Sydney, known as Ayelet HaShachar. The services are loosely based on the Humanistic Jewish movement in the United States and the musical-prayer group Nava Tehila in Israel.

In 2018, the first Jewish Renewal community formed under the name Nava Tehila Melbourne (a satellite community of Nava Tehila in Jerusalem). The community changed its name to HAVAYAH, and conducts monthly spiritual song gatherings.

Education

Schools 
The Melbourne Hebrew School was a Jewish day school established in 1855 under the auspices of the Melbourne Hebrew Congregation, providing general and also Hebrew studies until 1895.

In 1942, the first Jewish day school and kindergarten was formed in North Bondi, Sydney. The first communal Jewish day school, Mount Scopus College, was founded in Melbourne in 1949. In its first year, the school had 120 students, and reached a peak of 2,800 students in the 1980s. Today it is still one of the largest Jewish day school in the Jewish diaspora. The largest Jewish school in Australia today is Moriah College, Sydney.

The Jewish day school system provides an excellent academic, religious, Zionist, sporting and social experience. In recent decades, the ultra-orthodox and Reform movements have established their own schools and community schools have also formed. All in all, there are 19 Jewish day schools in Australia. It is estimated that in Melbourne between 70% and 75% of all Jewish students attend a Jewish school at some stage of their schooling. In Sydney, this figure is 62%. In 1996, over 10,000 Jewish students attended a Jewish school in Australia.

Jewish day schools in Australia are much more expensive than the government/state schools. Therefore, a number of state schools, especially in Sydney, have a large number of Jewish students. The Boards of Jewish Education attend to the Jewish educational needs of such students. As a result, several state schools offer Hebrew or Jewish Studies as elective courses. Further, a number of education boards also attend to Jewish students in the smaller centres of Adelaide, Brisbane and Canberra.

Higher education 
In addition to Jewish education at a school level, Australian Jewry have opportunities for Jewish higher education. The University of Sydney and Monash University in Melbourne both have full Jewish Studies departments, allowing students to study Jewish Civilization, Hebrew (Modern and Classical), Holocaust Studies, Yiddish and Zionism. Adult Jewish learning is also very popular in Australia, with the Melton Adult Education Program offering a variety of popular programs linked to the Hebrew University of Jerusalem. The Rabbinical College of Australia and New Zealand offers post-High School education in Jewish studies.

Multiculturalism as an ideology developed in Australia during the 1970s. During this period, Jewish cultural life expanded and was in some cases assisted by the government. There are numerous cultural and social organisations, Jewish radio shows and newspapers, and Jewish museums in both Melbourne and Sydney.

Religious institutions 
Australia's first Yeshivah the Rabbinical College of Australia and New Zealand was established in 1966 by Reb Zalman Serebryanski. In addition, the Chabad community founded Kollel Menachem, a community kollel founded in 1979.

Kollel Beth HaTalmud Yehudah Fishman Institute was founded in 1981, and was the first overseas community Kollel established by the Lakewood Yeshiva under the direction of Rabbi Shneur Kotler and Rabbi Nosson Wachtfogel. The Kollel consists of a core group of scholars who are engaged in full-time.

Adass Israel, a Hassidic community in Melbourne launched their own kollel, Kollel Beis Yosef in 1990 With the arrival of Rabbi Kohn as new rabbi of Adass, there has been the establishment of the 'Kolel Horaah' a training centre for in depth Jewish law offering courses to scholars and aspiring rabbi's alike. Adass Israel has also established a junior religious seminary (yeshivah ketanah), to prepare students for overseas yeshivot by in depth study of Talmud and Jewish law.
 
In 1983 Yeshivah College opened a special junior Hasidic talmudic seminary stream called Mesivtah Melbourne for high school students, where students from across Melbourne and Sydney study. The focus for this institution is religious studies without secular studies.

In 1998 Mizrachi opened a kollel in conjunction with Torah MiTziyon in Israel. Rabbis and yeshiva students are sent to Australia to help maintain the running of the kollel.

Institutions
Australian Jewry has a number of important social and cultural institutions. These include B'nai B'rith, the National Council of Jewish Women (NCJW) and Kadimah in Melbourne which sponsors Yiddish culture. In addition, the Hakoah Club in Sydney, which began as a sporting club, is today Sydney Jewry's main social and cultural meeting point, due to its central location in Bondi and excellent, modern premises. Several thousand Hassidic and Haredi Jews predominantly in Melbourne speak Yiddish as an everyday language.

Jewish cultural life as a whole has benefited from the growth of multiculturalism in Australia, particularly during the 1970s. Under the Labor government of Gough Whitlam, the Minister for Immigration, Al Grassby, recommended the establishment of ethnic broadcasting stations. The scheme was finally implemented in 1975, and since then the Jewish community has been served by Radio 2EA in Sydney and Radio 3EA in Melbourne, which in total broadcast in more than 50 community languages. The Jewish community languages are Hebrew, Yiddish and English.

In the 1980s and 1990s, Holocaust museums in both Melbourne and Sydney were established as part of increasing awareness of the Shoah (Holocaust). The Jewish Museum of Australia in Melbourne was opened by Rabbi Ronald Lubofski in 1982, and now has approximately 20,000 objects. Then in 1992, the opening of the Sydney Jewish Museum, dedicated to the Holocaust and Australian Jewish history and located in the historic Maccabean Hall, was heralded as "a landmark event".

Australian Jewish Media comprises radio, television, newspapers and newsletters, online magazines, blogs, and zines. The "Australia-Israel Review" has continued to be an important publication since its establishment in the 1970s. The longest-running Jewish community newspaper is the "Australian Jewish News", which celebrated its centenary in November 1995.

Zionist institutions
Australian Jewry is generally supportive of Israel. The community maintains a number of Zionist organisations which focus on fundraising, Zionist education including a range of Israel experience programs, youth movements, promotion of aliyah and a range of cultural institutions. Israel has recognised this by continuing to provide strong funding and other support for the Zionist Federation of Australia, which also enjoys representation at the senior level of the Jewish Agency.

Rabbinical courts

Melbourne is currently being serviced by a number of courts.

The first Beth Din in Australia was set up under the guidance of the Chief Rabbi of the Commonwealth in the 1800’s. This was the first Beth Din in the British Empire outside of London. Following revelations of abuse by Sholom Gutnick the senior rabbi of the Beth Din, a restructure of the MBD was undertaken under the joint control of the Rabbinical Council of Victoria (RCV) and the Council of Orthodox Synagogue of Victoria (COSV). In addition the Adass community maintain their own Beth Din. There are also a number of ad hoc Beth Dins that are set up, usually for financial decision, or for conversions.

The Sydney Beth Din was set up in 1905. It serves the Jewish communities in Australia, New Zealand and Asia. The Beth Din have become the main Beth Din for anyone outside of Victoria following the Melbourne Beth Din's restructure. The Sydney Beth Din has had problems recently when its members were ruled to have had contempt of court in a number of its decisions.

Demographics

Significant Jewish population centres

Melbourne
Melbourne's population is highly concentrated around the suburbs of North Caulfield and East St Kilda, although there are significant populations in the suburbs surrounding these suburbs.

There are a large number of schools servicing the community.
Mount Scopus Memorial College - modern Orthodox, Zionist school
Bialik College - secular Zionist school
Leibler Yavneh College - religious Zionist school. Founded in 1962 as a breakaway from Mount Scopus
Sholem Aleichem College - school founded by the Bundist community in Melbourne
King David School - Progressive Jewish school
Yeshiva-Beth Rivka College - boys and girls schools servicing the Chabad community
Adass Israel School - school servicing the ultra-Orthodox community
Yesodei HaTorah College - a non-Hassidic ultra-Orthodox school
Cheder Levi Yitzchak - a breakaway Chabad boys school with a more limited secular education.
Bnos Chana - a twin girls only school of Cheder Levi Yitzchak and a Chabad breakaway from Beth Rivkah
Divrei Emineh - a breakaway from Adass Israel serving the Satmar sect and some other Hasidic Jews
Tiferes Bnos Yiroel - a girl's Haredi school

There are numerous active congregations in the Jewish community, many concentrated in Caulfield and the St. Kilda suburbs, although other areas such as Bentleigh house a significant number of communities.

The Jewish Museum of Australia displays Judaica, ritual objects, Holocaust material, and paintings and sculptures by Jewish authors. The nearby Kadimah Cultural Centre shows Jewish and Yiddish drama, and has a large library of Judaica. There are also kosher restaurants and grocery stores throughout the St. Kilda area.

The Australian Jewish News is based in Melbourne, but distributed Australia wide. The Jewish report is published monthly in Melbourne and Sydney, and the Hamodia Australian edition services the Haredi community.  There are also numerous pamphlets that are produced for distribution in synagogues around Australia. And international Haredi magazines such as Mishpacha and Ami are printed in Melbourne weekly as well

Notable Writers academics, and journalists, such as Arnold Zable, Elliot Perlman, Mark Baker, John Safran, broadcasters, such as Raphael Epstein, Jon Faine, Ramona Koval, and Libby Gorr have been prominent in old media and are now joined by a younger generation increasingly making its voice heard through new media, such as comedians who use YouTube, Michael Shafar and Justine Sless.

Sydney

Sydney’s Jewish community is considered one of the most thriving and dynamic in the diaspora. There are an estimated 50,000 Jews in New South Wales out of an Australian Jewish population of 120,000.

Jews can be found throughout the Greater Sydney area, although approximately two-thirds reside in the eastern suburbs, from Vaucluse, through Randwick, Bondi and Double Bay, to Darlinghurst-East Sydney,  where many of the service organisations are located. Most of the remainder live on the upper north shore, predominantly in the suburbs situated between Chatswood and St Ives. Smaller but active pockets reside in such areas as Maroubra, Coogee, Leichhardt, Newtown and Marrickville. Strathfield, in the Inner West, was historically a centre for the Jewish community in Sydney, but the Jewish population of the area dwindled in recent decades and the synagogue closed in 2013.

One of the strengths of the Sydney community is the significant contribution by overseas immigrants, to the extent that over two-thirds of the Sydney Jewish population originates from South Africa, Hungary, the former Soviet Union and Israel.

Perth
Carmel School is a Jewish day school in Perth.
Today's Jewish Perth is a growing and vibrant community that is diverse and inclusive.  The community numbers over 7,000 and there are a number of different religious congregations catering to the diverse interests, beliefs and traditions of this active community.

The oldest congregation, established over 110 years ago, is the Perth Hebrew Congregation, led by Rabbi David Freilich. The Perth Hebrew Congregation, also referred to simply as the Perth Synagogue, has more membership than all the other synagogues combined in Perth and thus caters for the vast majority of the Jewish population. They have erected an eruv making travel to and from the shul easier for the large number of orthodox families.

Adelaide
In Adelaide there have been many Jews involved in the history of the city, with many successful civic leaders and people in the arts. Jacob Barrow Montefiore was a member of the South Australian Colonization Commission in London from 1835 to 1839, a body appointed by the British Government to oversee the establishment the Colony of South Australia, and Montefiore Hill in North Adelaide was named after him His brother, Joseph Barrow Montefiore was a businessman in Adelaide; both brothers also had interests in New South Wales, and other family members were also prominent in the new colonies.

Since February 2017, Professor Ghil'ad Zuckermann from the University of Adelaide has been the President of the Australian Association for Jewish Studies. In November 2020, the Adelaide Holocaust Museum and Andrew Steiner Education Centre (AHMSEC) was established.

Assimilation and demographic changes

The same social and cultural characteristics of Australia that facilitated the extraordinary economic, political, and social success of the Australian Jewish community have also been attributed to contributing to widespread assimilation. From 2008 to 2012, more than 400 Australian Jews moved to Israel and most of them have done compulsory military service. There was an almost 50 percent increase in immigration from Australia to Israel between 2009 and 2010. There was a 45 percent increase in percentage of immigration in 2010, the highest of the English speaking countries; 240 Australians moved to Israel, up from 165 in 2009.

Prior to 1933, the intermarriage rate in the Australian Jewish community was approximately 30%. This high percentage potentially threatened the future of the community. However, the arrival of Jewish refugees prior to and following World War II, changed the pattern of assimilation.

Demographic research indicates that the intermarriage rate dropped immediately after the war and that by 1971, almost 90% of Jewish men and over 90% of Jewish women were married to Jewish partners.

The 1996 census showed that the intermarriage rate for all Australian Jewry was 15%. Once again, the smaller Jewish communities appear to have a higher rate of intermarriage, with Melbourne's rate far lower than that of Sydney. Similar research, conducted in 1999 by Sydney's Jewish Communal Appeal, concluded that one third of that generation have a non-Jewish partner.

Along with intermarriage comes the physical relocation of many Jews, who prefer to leave the densely populated Jewish areas and the reservoir of potential Jewish life partners. In the rural areas of New South Wales for example, where only 5% of the State's Jewry reside, intermarriage rises to 84%. Even in the larger towns, assimilation and intermarriage vary from area to area.

Of the two most recent waves of immigration to Australia between 1986 and 1991, Jews from the Former Soviet Union seem to have a considerably high intermarriage rate, in contrast to the South African Jewish immigrants, for whom intermarriage is almost entirely unknown.

Distribution of Jewish Australians
According to the profile.id.com.au the 10 local government areas  with the largest Jewish communities, based by percentage of total population, were:

Languages

The vast majority of Jews speak English; indeed three-quarters (75.1%) speak no other language and of the remainder, 16.9% speak English 'Very well' and 5.0% speak it 'Well'. Nevertheless, many Jews do not speak English at home (26,242 people) and of these, the most common non-English language spoken in Jewish homes was Russian, spoken by an estimated 9,964 people. However, Hebrew is likely to become the most common non-English language spoken at home in the future (if this is not already the case) with an estimated 9,543 Jewish people speaking it at home. The number of Hebrew speakers increased by 23.6% from 2006 to 2011 and the number of French speakers increased by 12.7%. Yet non-English languages are becoming rarer overall; excluding Hebrew, the number of non-English speakers decreased by 8.3% since 2006, most likely due to the passing of older Holocaust survivors and other Jewish refugees from Nazi-occupied Europe.

Language spoken at home, estimated number of Jewish people:

 Data exclude language not-stated responses. Columns may not sum to 100% due to rounding.

See also

 Antisemitism in Australia
 Australian Association for Jewish Studies
 Australian Jews in Israel
 History of the Jews in Australia
 Israeli Australians
 List of Oceanian Jews

References 

 
Jewish Australian history